Hewitt is a city in Todd County, Minnesota, United States, along the Wing River.  The population was 266 at the 2010 census.

History
Hewitt was platted in 1891, and named for Henry Hewitt, an early settler. A post office has been in operation at Hewitt since 1891.  The Hewitt Public School, built in 1911, is listed on the National Register of Historic Places.

Geography

U.S. Route 71 and Minnesota State Highway 210 are two of the main routes in the community.

Demographics

2010 census
As of the census of 2010, there were 266 people, 113 households, and 64 families living in the city. The racial makeup of the city was 100.0% White. Hispanic or Latino of any race were 1.1% of the population.

There were 113 households, of which 28.3% had children under the age of 18 living with them, 46.0% were married couples living together, 6.2% had a female householder with no husband present, 4.4% had a male householder with no wife present, and 43.4% were non-families. 36.3% of all households were made up of individuals, and 15.9% had someone living alone who was 65 years of age or older. The average household size was 2.35 and the average family size was 3.17.

The median age in the city was 40.3 years. 25.2% of residents were under the age of 18; 5.6% were between the ages of 18 and 24; 25.2% were from 25 to 44; 28.2% were from 45 to 64; and 15.8% were 65 years of age or older. The gender makeup of the city was 46.6% male and 53.4% female.

2000 census
As of the census of 2000, there were 267 people, 109 households, and 69 families living in the city. The racial makeup of the city was 98.88% White, 0.37% Native American, 0.37% Asian, and 0.37% from two or more races. Hispanic or Latino of any race were 0.75% of the population.

There were 109 households, out of which 29.4% had children under the age of 18 living with them, 51.4% were married couples living together, 6.4% had a female householder with no husband present, and 35.8% were non-families. 27.5% of all households were made up of individuals, and 14.7% had someone living alone who was 65 years of age or older.  The average household size was 2.41 and the average family size was 2.90.

In the city, the population was spread out, with 23.6% under the age of 18, 10.5% from 18 to 24, 24.0% from 25 to 44, 22.8% from 45 to 64, and 19.1% who were 65 years of age or older.  The median age was 38 years. For every 100 females, there were 110.2 males.  For every 100 females age 18 and over, there were 104.0 males.

The median income for a household in the city was $26,161, and the median income for a family was $27,500. Males had a median income of $22,500 versus $18,750 for females. The per capita income for the city was $12,520.  About 7.7% of families and 13.4% of the population were below the poverty line, including 7.3% of those under the age of eighteen and 18.1% of those 65 or over.

References

Cities in Minnesota
Cities in Todd County, Minnesota